Wrights is an unincorporated community in Greene County, Illinois, United States.

Notable person
The agricultural and railroad historian, Roy Vernon Scott, retired from Mississippi State University, was born in Wrights in 1927.

References

Unincorporated communities in Greene County, Illinois
Unincorporated communities in Illinois